Woonpasan Sports Club is a North Korean football club that plays in the DPR Korea League, the highest football soccer league in North Korea. Unpasan is a mountain in Ryongjŏng-ri, Pyoksong County, South Hwanghae Province.It participated in the 1996 Mangyongdae prize sports football competition.

Footnotes

Football clubs in North Korea